Chechi may refer to:

 Chechi (film), a 1950 Malayalam film
 Chechi, Attock, a village in Pakistan

People with the surname
 Jury Chechi, Italian gymnast

See also 
 Checchi, an Italian surname
 Chachi (disambiguation)
 Chhachi (Pashtun tribe)